Because the First World War was still underway at the date of the election, under the terms of the Parliament and Local Elections Act, 1918, the term of office of the members of the Council were extended by one year.

However, there were three new seats for which elections were held.
These were new second seats for Allerton, Childwall and Little Woolton ; Fazakerley and Much Woolton wards that up until this date had each been represented by a single councillor.

After the election, the composition of the council was:

Election result

Ward results

Allerton, Childwall and Little Woolton

Fazakerley

Much Woolton

Aldermanic Elections

Aldermanic Election 22 January 1919

Caused by the resignation of Alderman Sir Charles Petrie, Bart (Conservative, 
last elected as an Alderman on 9 November 1910) which ]
was reported to the Council on 9 November 1918

In his place, Councillor Frederick James Rawlinson (Conservative, 
Garston, elected 1 November 1913)
was elected by the Council as an Alderman on 22 January 1919

Aldermanic Election 7 May 1919

Caused by the death of Alderman George Brodrick Smith-Brodrick 
(Conservative, appointed by the Council 
as an Alderman on 9 November 1917)
on 12 February 1919

In his place Councillor James Wilson Walker 
(Conservative, Old Swan, elected 1 November 1912)
, 
Tobacco Manufacturer of 37 Westmorland Road, Huyton was elected as an alderman by the councillors on 7 May 1919.

Appointment of Councillors

During the World War I elections were not held. When vacancies 
arose, replacement councillors were appointed by the Council rather than being elected
in by elections.

No. 30 Wavertree, 9 November 1918

Caused by the resignation of Councillor Alfred Henry Bramley (Conservative, Wavertree, appointed 7 February 1917), which was reported to the Council on 4 September 1918.

In his place Lieut-Colonel Henry Langton Beckwith, Architect and Surveyor of 
Sunnyside, Sandown Park, Wavertree, was appointed by the Council as a 
Councillor on 9 November 1918

By Elections

No. 15 Sefton Park East, 28 January 1919

Caused by the resignation of Councillor Arthur Bromley Holmes (Party?, 
elected unopposed on 1 November 1914) which was reported to the 
Council on 4 December 1918

No. 37 Garston, 5 February 1919

Caused by the election as an alderman of Councillor Frederick James Rawlinson 
(Conservative, Garston, elected 1 November 1913)
 on 22 January 1919

No. 32 Old Swan, 20 May 1919 

Caused by Councillor James Wilson Walker 
(Conservative, Old Swan, elected 1 November 1912)
, being elected as an alderman on 7 May 1919
, foolowing the death of Alderman George Brodrick 
Smith-Brodrick 
(Conservative, appointed by the Council 
as an Alderman on 9 November 1917)
on 12 February 1919.

No. 21 Everton, 21 May 1919

Caused by the resignation of Councillor Brigadier General Gerald Kyffin-Taylor 
(Conservative, Everton, elected 1 November 1913)
, 
which was reported to the Council on 7 May 1919

No. 16 Sefton Park West, 22 May 1919

Caused by the resignation of Councillor Ernest Cranstoun Given
(Conservative, Sefton Park West, elected 1 November 1911)
, 
which was reported to the Council on 7 May 1919

See also

 Liverpool City Council
 Liverpool Town Council elections 1835 - 1879
 Liverpool City Council elections 1880–present
 Mayors and Lord Mayors of Liverpool 1207 to present
 History of local government in England

References

1918
1918 English local elections
1910s in Liverpool